Dolno Dryanovo is a village in Garmen Municipality, in Blagoevgrad Province, Bulgaria. It is situated in the Dabrash part of the Rhodope Mountains 7 kilometers east-southeast of Garmen and 82 kilometers southeast of Blagoevgrad on the third class road Gotse Delchev - Satovcha - Dospat.

History and religion
The village was first mentioned in 1636 year in the Ottoman registers. The people are Muslim of Pomak origin. There are two mosques raised in the center of the village. The older mosque was built before more than 500 years and was restored in 2008. The newer one was built in 1998 and is one of the biggest in the Chech region.

Education and health care
The Primary school "Hristo Botev" was renovated in 2011 year. There is a kindergarten and a community center with a public library and amateur folklore dances formations for men and women. The health care is provided by a general practitioner doctor and a dental clinic.

Tourism
 Stone heads sanctuary - it is a newly discovered prehistoric sanctuary, combined with a Thracian sanctuary. There are several stone figurines, that was thought to be a natural phenomenon, but it appeared that they are human-made. The sanctuary is located 2.5 kilometers northeast of the village.
 500-year-old mosque in the center of the village.

References

Villages in Blagoevgrad Province